Common names: Mexican dusky rattlesnake, dusky rattlesnake

Crotalus triseriatus is a venomous pit viper species found in Mexico. Two subspecies are currently recognized, including the nominate subspecies described here.

Description

Geographic range
The species C. triseriatus is found in Mexico, along the southern edge of the Mexican Plateau in the highlands of the Transverse Volcanic Cordillera, including the states of Jalisco, México, Michoacán, Morelos, Nayarit, Puebla, Tlaxcala, and Veracruz. The type locality given by Wagler in 1830 is "Mexico". A restriction to "Alvarez, San Luis Potosí, Mexico" was proposed by H.M. Smith and Taylor (1950).

Habitat
Crotalus triseriatus occurs in pine-oak forest, boreal forest, coniferous forest and, bunchgrass grasslands. On Volcán Orizaba, it is found at very high altitudes.

Conservation status
The species C. triseriatus is classified as Least Concern on the IUCN Red List of Threatened Species (v3.1, 2001). Species are listed as such due to their wide distribution, presumed large population, or because they are unlikely to be declining fast enough to qualify for listing in a more threatened category. The population trend was stable when assessed in 2007.

Feeding
Prey reportedly found in stomachs of C. triseriatus include a frog, a murid rodent (Neotomodon alstoni), lizards, other small mammals, crickets, and salamanders.

Venom
Bite symptoms from C. triseriatus are reported to include intense pain, swelling, faintness, and cold perspiration.

Subspecies

Etymology
The subspecific name, armstrongi, is in honor of American herpetologist Barry L. Armstrong.

Taxonomy
In the relatively recent past, two additional subspecies were described:

C. t. anahuacus  - currently regarded as a junior synonym of C. t. triseriatus
C. t. quadrangularis  - currently regarded as a junior synonym of C. aquilus

References

Further reading
Campbell JA (1979). "A New Rattlesnake (Reptilia, Serpentes, Viperidae) from Jalisco, Mexico". Transactions of the Kansas Academy of Science 81 (4): 365–370. (Crotalus triseriatus armstrongi, new subspecies).
Wagler J (1830). Natürliches System der AMPHIBIEN, mit vorangehender Classification der SÄUGTHIERE und VÖGEL. Ein Beitrag zur vergleichenden Zoologie.  München, Stuttgart and Tübingen: J.G. Cotta. vi + 354 pp. + one plate. (Uropsophus triseriatus, new species, p. 176). (in German and Latin).

External links

triseriatus
Reptiles of Mexico
Reptiles described in 1830